The Bellarine Railway, formerly the Bellarine Peninsula Railway, is a volunteer-operated steam-driven tourist railway located in Victoria, Australia. It operates on a 16 km section of a formerly disused branch line on the Bellarine Peninsula between the coastal town of Queenscliff and Drysdale, near Geelong.

History as a working railway 

The original line was commissioned in September 1878, and opened on 21 May 1879. It connected Queenscliff with South Geelong station, the terminus of the Geelong line, and the junction of the Warrnambool line. It was acknowledged at the time that although passenger traffic alone might not justify a railway line, military traffic from both the port and Fort Queenscliff—a key defence installation—would warrant its construction. It initially carried passenger, goods and military traffic, and continued to do so for several decades.

In the first few months of operation, it carried only one service per day, but at its peak, in January 1885, four trains per day ran in each direction, enabling the line to be used by commuters. However, this was decreased to three, and was cut back to two trains a day in 1910. Traffic on the line continued to fall over the next twenty years, and in 1931, passenger services were dropped completely—apart from the occasional Sunday excursion train. Freight services continued to run, although they were cut to back at first to twice-weekly, and then weekly operation.

The line saw a revival during World War II, carrying mines from the Swan Island military base, but returned to pre-war levels afterwards. After the war, services became less frequent, with passenger services dropped altogether, apart from occasional special trains, and with goods services cut back to one a fortnight. The line was closed on 6 November 1976. The line is recognised as the oldest Victorian branch line still in operation.

Preservation and re-opening as a tourist railway 
In 1968, when the Queenscliff line was still officially open, the Fyansford Cement Works Railway near Geelong was closed. The cement company donated all its steam rolling stock to preservation groups, and the Geelong division of the Australian Railway Historical Society (ARHS), which was still in its infancy, received two engines. While Drysdale station was looked upon as a preferred site, this proved difficult to arrange, and a temporary site at the Belmont Common was used.

The Geelong division of the ARHS registered itself as the Geelong Steam Preservation Society in 1970 and it constructed and operated a small tourist railway, the Belmont Common Railway, on the Belmont Common. However, the site faced ongoing problems due to adjacent developments and its location on a flood plain, and by 1976, it was apparent that continuing on the Belmont Common site would not be feasible. When it became clear that Victorian Railways intended closing the Queenscliff line, the GSPS saw an opportunity, and after the line was closed permanently in 1976, it began shifting operations to Queenscliff railway station.

During 1976 and 1977, the Society engaged in fundraising efforts and began regauging a short section of track around Queenscliff station, in order to enable its rolling stock to operate on the line. With the help of some government funding, it succeeded in operating its first services from Queenscliff to Laker's Siding in May 1979, and to Drysdale not long after.

Current operations 

The railway currently operates a Heritage Train Service between Queenscliff and Drysdale, along the southern shoreline of Swan Bay and through grazing land, with an intermediate stop at Laker's Siding.

The heritage service is available on Sundays, most public holidays, as well as Tuesdays and Thursdays during the Easter, June and September school holidays. During the summer school holidays, trains run every day from Boxing Day until the end of the first week in January, then every day until the Australia Day weekend, except for Mondays and Fridays. The Heritage Service does not run on Day Out With Thomas and Queenscliff Music Festival weekends.

Carriage hire is available as part of the Heritage Service and suitable for children's parties or groups looking for the benefits of private train hire without the added cost.

Experiences, specials and events offered include:
 School holiday programsLocomotive Cab rides available on days the Heritage Service is running
 Steam and Diesel Train Driver Experiences
 Day Out With Thomas weekends
 Special occasion and wedding charters
 Mid-week tailored group and school tours 
 The Blues Train, features live music on most Saturday evenings from August to May.

The remainder of the line between Drysdale and South Geelong has fallen into disuse, and the GSPS has not attempted to extend its operations back to Leopold or South Geelong. The sections of the former route from Drysdale to South Geelong, along with a walking track adjacent to the Queenscliff-Drysdale line, now form the Bellarine Rail Trail, accessible to cyclists and walkers.

The railway features a working collection of locomotives from all four state government-run  gauge railway bodies in Australia; Tasmania, Western Australia, South Australia and Queensland; as well as from a number of Australian industrial railways. In late 2011, the railway negotiated to relocate the last remaining Australian Standard Garratt to the Bellarine Railway, from the Newport Railway Museum. The transportation of the locomotive took place on 31 May 2013, with the Bellarine Railway hoping to restore it to active service.

Locomotives

Steam Locomotives

Diesel Locomotives

Railcars

Restored passenger carriages

Stations

Gallery

References

External links
Bellarine Railway
The Blues Train
The Q train
Using the Bellarine Railway as part of a weekend adventure

Tourist railways in Victoria (Australia)
Heritage railways in Australia
1879 establishments in Australia
Railway stations in Geelong
Bellarine Peninsula
Borough of Queenscliffe
Transport in Barwon South West (region)